Hunger Mountain is an American literary magazine founded in 2002 by Caroline Mercurio. A member of the Council of Literary Magazines and Presses, Hunger Mountain is based in Montpelier, Vermont at The Vermont College of Fine Arts, one of the top-ranked low residency MFA (Master of Fine Arts) programs in the country. 

Originally published in Spring and Fall, there is now a yearly print issue as well as online issues. Hunger Mountain publishes fiction, poetry, creative nonfiction, young adult and children's writing, and visual art. The online issues also showcase author interviews and craft essays.

Reading period is from May 1 to October 1, during which time general submissions are accepted.

History

Hunger Mountain is named for a mountain in Middlesex, Vermont. According to legend, a group of men who went hunting on this mountain always returned home hungry, having caught only one quail between them. This mountain can be seen from many vantage points in Montpelier, where Hunger Mountain the magazine is located. The initial goals of the magazine were to call attention to established and emerging writers, while also highlighting local Vermont writers and artists. The journal was founded in 2002 by Caroline Mercurio and was made possible through a generous donation from a Vermont College of Fine Arts MFA in Writing alumnus. The premiere issue, released in the fall of 2002, included work by Wally Lamb, Maxine Kumin, and an interview with Grace Paley. Miciah Bay Gault took over as managing editor in 2009 and Samantha Kolber began her post as managing editor in July 2015.

Current masthead
 
Adam McOmber, editor, fiction editor
Tomás Q. Morín, poetry editor
Sue William Silverman, creative nonfiction editor
 Allison Grimaldi Donahue, translations editor
 Jonathan Smith, managing editor

Writing contests
Each year, Hunger Mountain sponsors four writing contests for different genres. The entry deadline for each contest is March 1.
 The Howard Frank Mosher Short Fiction Prize
 The Ruth Stone Poetry Prize
 The Hunger Mountain Creative Nonfiction Prize
 The Katherine Paterson Prize for Young Adult/Children's Literature

Past contributors
Contributors to Hunger Mountain have received and been nominated for numerous accolades, among them MacArthur Fellowship Grants, Guggenheim Fellowships, Pushcart Prizes, PEN/O'Henry Prizes, and National Endowment for the Arts Fellowship in Fiction.

 KB Ballentine
 Pinckney Benedict
 Robin Black
 Michael Burkard
 Ron Carlson
 Hayden Carruth
 Kwame Dawes
 Matthew Dickman
 Mark Doty
 Rita Dove
 Philip Graham
 Alison Hawthorne Deming
 Terrance Hayes
 Robin Hemley
 Bob Hicok
 Tony Hoagland

 Alice Hoffman
 Pam Houston
 David Huddle
 Maxine Kumin
 Peter LaSalle
 Dorianne Laux
 Sydney Lea
 Paul Lisicky
 Bret Lott
 Michael Martone
 Howard Frank Mosher
 Naomi Shihab Nye
 Ann Pancake
 Katherine Paterson
 Edith Pearlman

 Lucia Perillo
 Marge Piercy
 George Saunders
 Dani Shapiro
 Charles Simic
 Patricia Smith
 Terese Svoboda
 James Tate
 Samrat Upadhyay
 Jean Valentine
 Laura van den Berg
 Tobias Wolff
 Charles Wright
 Dean Young

References

External links
 Official website

2002 establishments in Vermont
Annual magazines published in the United States
Biannual magazines published in the United States
Magazines established in 2002
Magazines published in Vermont
Online literary magazines published in the United States
Vermont College of Fine Arts
Triannual magazines published in the United States